Lisa Petersson Moazzeni  (born 5 February 1992) is a Swedish football defender who played for Djurgårdens IF. She has played Damallsvenskan football for Kristianstads DFF and AIK.

References

Swedish women's footballers
Swedish people of Italian descent
Kristianstads DFF players
AIK Fotboll (women) players
Djurgårdens IF Fotboll (women) players
Damallsvenskan players
1992 births
Living people
Women's association football defenders
Lindsdals IF players